Damieon Dante Hall (born September 20, 1978) is an American former football wide receiver and return specialist who played nine seasons in the National Football League (NFL). He is nicknamed the "Human Joystick" and the "X-Factor". Hall was a fifth-round draft pick out of Texas A&M University by the Kansas City Chiefs in the 2000 NFL Draft. Hall played for the Chiefs for seven years before being traded to the St. Louis Rams on April 25, 2007, for the Rams' third and fifth-round picks in the 2007 NFL Draft. Hall was ranked the 10th greatest return specialist in NFL history on NFL Network's NFL Top 10 Return Aces.

College career

Hall played for Texas A&M University as a running back and return specialist. His 4,707 all-purpose yards place him second in school history behind Darren Lewis. He majored in Ag Leadership & Development.

On November 8, 1999, Texas A&M head coach R. C. Slocum announced Hall's dismissal from the team for violations of the team's policy. Hall stated he thinks he was ousted due to parking violations.

Professional career

Kansas City Chiefs
The Kansas City Chiefs drafted Hall in the fifth-round of the 2000 NFL Draft. He made his NFL debut on September 24, 2000, as a kick/punt returner. In five games, he returned 17 kickoffs for 358 yards and six punts for 37 yards.

He spent the spring of 2001 playing in NFL Europe for the Scottish Claymores as a wide receiver. He led the league with 26 kickoff returns for 635 yards and was second in punt returns with 15 for 177 yards and second in combined net yards with 1,286.

In 2002, Hall had his first NFL touchdown off a 60-yard reception at the New York Jets on October 6, 2002. Hall returned one kickoff and two punts for touchdowns. His two touchdowns off punt returns tied him for first in Chief franchise history. The 2002 NFL season earned Hall his first NFL Pro Bowl, being selected as a kick returner. Hall became the second player in NFL history to return a kickoff and a punt return for a touchdown in the same game.

In 2003, Hall returned a kickoff or a punt for a touchdown four games in a row, which is an NFL record. The most memorable moment of the season came against the Denver Broncos in which he reversed direction twice to evade the entire special teams unit en route to a 93-yard punt return for a touchdown, his 7th in the 10-game stretch from the previous season, then went on to score 10 total touchdowns in 13 games. In the playoffs that year against the Indianapolis Colts, Hall had another kickoff return for a touchdown, giving him five for the year, as well as a receiving touchdown. Hall was named to the 2004 Pro Bowl as a kick/punt returner for his second time.

In 2004, Hall touched the ball eight times for 242 yards vs. the San Diego Chargers on November 28, 2004. His six kickoff returns for 233 yards with a 96-yard touchdown in the game set a career-high. On December 19, 2004, he returned the opening kickoff 97-yards for a touchdown. This touchdown made him the Chiefs' franchise leader in career kickoff return touchdowns and career special teams touchdowns. During the 2004 NFL season, Hall set single-season Chiefs' franchise records with 68 kickoff returns and career-high 1,718 kickoff return yards.

In 2005, in a memorable game against the Denver Broncos, Hall appeared to be on his way to a kickoff return for a touchdown, but he surprisingly fumbled the ball without being touched by a defensive player. With a touchdown on a kickoff return against the Philadelphia Eagles on October 2, 2005, he tied four players, among them Ollie Matson and Gale Sayers, for the most career kickoff return touchdowns, with six. That record stood until Joshua Cribbs broke it in 2009. Hall's sixth return was also his 10th return touchdown, placing him third in that category behind Brian Mitchell (13) and Eric Metcalf (12).

In 2006, Hall had two kickoff returns for 86 yards and three punt returns for seven yards in Week 12 vs. the Denver Broncos on November 23, 2006. This game made him the sixth player to have 10,000 career kick return yards. Hall played his second postseason game at Indianapolis on January 6, 2007, in a rematch from the 2003 Divisional Playoffs.

St. Louis Rams
In 2007, Hall was traded along with a third-round draft pick to the St. Louis Rams for their third and fifth-round draft pick in the 2007 NFL Draft. Hall tied Metcalf on September 30, 2007 against the Dallas Cowboys with his 12th return touchdown. On October 7, 2008, Hall injured his ankle vs. the Arizona Cardinals, missing four games. He further aggravated his ankle on October 25, 2008, vs. the Seattle Seahawks and was placed on injured reserve.

After football

In 2013, Hall worked as an assistant coach at St. Anthony High School in Long Beach, California. In 2016, he spent several months as a radio host for KILT-FM in Houston, Texas.

NFL career statistics

Receiving Stats 

Rushing Stats

Returning Stats

Chiefs franchise records
 Most career kick return yards (8,644)
 Most career kick return touchdowns (6)
 Most career punt return touchdowns (5)
 Most career combined punt and kickoff return touchdowns (11)
 Most career All-purpose yards (12,356)
 Most kickoff return yards in a single season: 1,718 (2004)
 Most All-purpose yards in a single season: 2,446 (2003)

Media

Hall is the co-author of Dante Hall: X-Factor, a book that details his journey from Texas A&M running back to one of the best kick returners in the NFL. He is mentioned in Lil Wayne's song "Dipset (Reppin Time)" in the line "I'm like Dante Hall, I just throw up the X." Hall appeared as a guest on the Late Show with David Letterman on October 30, 2003.

Nicknames
Hall has established many nicknames in his career, perhaps the best known being "X-factor", referring to how whenever he scored a touchdown he would cross his forearms to resemble an "X". Hall was also known as "The Human Joystick", referring to the agility he showed during returns.

References

External links

 Rams Player Bio

1978 births
Living people
People from Houston
Players of American football from Texas
American football wide receivers
American football return specialists
American football running backs
Texas A&M Aggies football players
Scottish Claymores players
Kansas City Chiefs players
American Conference Pro Bowl players
St. Louis Rams players